Sikatuna may refer to:

Datu Sikatuna, an ancient chieftain of Bohol in the Philippines
Sikatuna, Bohol, municipality of the Philippines